Talgat Safich Tadzhuddin (Tälğät Safa ulı Tacetdin; born 12 October 1948, in Kazan) is a Russian Shaykh al-Islām. He is Grand Mufti of Russia and Chairman of the Central Spiritual Administration of the Muslims of Russia, from 1992 to the present.

Biography 
Talgat Tadzhuddin was born in Kazan, USSR, on 12 October 1948 to a Tatar family. His father was a lorry driver and his mother worked at a factory.

In 1966, he was admitted at the Mir-i Arab Madrassah in Bukhara (then in the USSR) where he graduated with honours in 1973. He also studied at Cairo′s Al-Azhar University in 1978.

In 1973, he was elected second imam khatib of the historical Märcani Mosque in Kazan and in 1978 he was elected first imam of the mosque.

On 19 June 1980, he was elected a mufti and chairman of the Spiritual Muslim Directorate of the European Part of the USSR and Siberia (DUMES), one of four such directorates in the USSR then.

In May 1990, the conference of heads of Muslim Spiritual Directorates of the USSR elected him chairman of the directorate for international relations of the USSR′s Muslim organisations, later the Association of external relations of Muslim organisations, which he still heads.

In 1992, DUMES was transformed into the Central Spiritual Administration of the Muslims of Russia and the European countries of the CIS; the rank of Grand Mufti was created and bestowed on Talgat Tadzhuddin.

In December 2015 Tadzhuddin relinquished his administrative positions. However, on February 20, 2016, at an expanded meeting of the Presidium of the Central Spiritual Administration of Muslims in Ufa, a decision was made to cancel the farman decree. Thus, T. Tadzhuddin remained at his post.

Public statements 

Tadzhuddin has at least on one occasion claimed that he is Bulgarian, arguing that Tartars are the descendants of Volga Bulgaria after it fell during the Mongol invasions.
   
In February 2006, Tadzhuddin joined leaders of the Russian Orthodox Church as well as the city of Moscow government in protesting against a planned gay pride parade in Moscow. He urged Russia's Muslims to stage violent protests if the march went ahead: "If they come out on to the streets anyway they should be flogged. Any normal person would do that - Muslims and Orthodox Christians alike [...] [The protests] might be even more intense than protests abroad against those controversial cartoons."

After Russia launched its military intervention in Syria in the autumn of 2015, speaking to the IV World Qoroltai of the Bashkirs in Ufa in November 2015, Tadzhuddin reported his chat with Russian president Vladimir Putin at the celebration ceremony of the Unity Day several days prior, thus, "I addressed him: Vladimir Vladimirovich, perhaps we should do to Syria and Israel what we have done to Crimea? [...] We ought to take [them]. May Russia extend to Mecca."

Tadzhuddin supported the 2022 Russian invasion of Ukraine and blamed the Ukrainian government and "the Western world" for "trying to arrange a genocide [of the Russian people] and revive fascism."

Honours and awards
 Order of Honour (12 October 2008) - for services to the development of spiritual culture and strengthening friendship between peoples
 Order of Friendship (21 September 1998) - for his great contribution to strengthening friendship and cooperation between peoples
 Order of St. Prince Daniil Moskovsky, 2nd class (Russian Orthodox Church, 2008) - for strengthening inter-religious peace and harmony

References 

1948 births
Living people
Islam in Kazan
Russian imams
Russian Sunni Muslims
Russian nationalists
Soviet muftis
Tatar people of Russia
People from Kazan
21st-century imams
Recipients of the Order of Honour (Russia)
Chief Muftis of Russia